Selim Nurudeen (born 1 February 1983) is a hurdler from Nigeria. In 2010 he competed at the 2010 African Championships in Nairobi and won the silver medal in the 110 metre hurdles with a time of 13.83 seconds.  He has twice represented Nigeria at the Olympics, in 2008 and 2012. He currently holds Nigerian athletic records in the indoor 60 meter hurdles with a time of 7.64.

References

External links
 sports-reference.com

Nigerian male hurdlers
1983 births
Living people
Olympic athletes of Nigeria
Athletes (track and field) at the 2008 Summer Olympics
Athletes (track and field) at the 2012 Summer Olympics
People from Friendswood, Texas
Sportspeople from Harris County, Texas
Notre Dame Fighting Irish men's track and field athletes
African Games gold medalists for Nigeria
African Games medalists in athletics (track and field)
African Games silver medalists for Nigeria
Athletes (track and field) at the 2007 All-Africa Games
Athletes (track and field) at the 2011 All-Africa Games